The 1958–59 NCAA University Division men's basketball season began in December 1958, progressed through the regular season and conference tournaments, and concluded with the 1959 NCAA University Division basketball tournament championship game on March 21, 1959, at Freedom Hall in Louisville, Kentucky. The California Golden Bears won their first NCAA national championship with a 71–70 victory over the West Virginia Mountainneers.

Season headlines 

 The Pacific Coast Conference disbanded at the end of the season.

Season outlook

Pre-season polls 

The Top 20 from the AP Poll and the UPI Coaches Poll during the pre-season.

Conference membership changes

Regular season

Conference winners and tournaments

Informal championships

Statistical leaders

Post-season tournaments

NCAA tournament

Final Four 

 Third Place – Cincinnati 98, Louisville 85

National Invitation tournament

Semifinals & finals 

 Third Place – NYU 71, Providence 57

Awards

Consensus All-American teams

Major player of the year awards 

 Helms Player of the Year: Oscar Robertson, Cincinnati
 UPI Player of the Year: Oscar Robertson, Cincinnati
 Oscar Robertson Trophy (USBWA): Oscar Robertson, Cincinnati
 Sporting News Player of the Year: Oscar Robertson, Cincinnati

Major coach of the year awards 

 Henry Iba Award: Eddie Hickey, Marquette
 NABC Coach of the Year: Eddie Hickey, Marquette
 UPI Coach of the Year: Adolph Rupp, Kentucky

Other major awards 

 Robert V. Geasey Trophy (Top player in Philadelphia Big 5): Joe Spratt, Saint Joseph's
 NIT/Haggerty Award (Top player in New York City metro area): Al Seiden, St. John's

Coaching changes 

A number of teams changed coaches during the season and after it ended.

References